Abide with Me is a Christian hymn composed by Henry Francis Lyte in 1847.

Abide with Me may also refer to:

 Abide with Me (novel), a 2006 novel by Elizabeth Strout
 Abide with Me (play), a 1935 play by Clare Boothe Luce
 A television drama based on A Child in the Forest by Winifred Foley

See also
"Abide with Me, 'Tis Eventide", an American Christian hymn written by Martin Lowrie Hofford and Harrison Millard in 1870
 I Abide with Me, a 1914 movie directed by Joseph Franz